David Landreth School is a historic school building located in the Point Breeze neighborhood of Philadelphia, Pennsylvania. It was built in 1889 after the original school caught fire (it had been on the nursery grounds of the D. Landreth Seed Company). 

It is a two-story, three-bay, brick building with a stone foundation in the Gothic Revival style. A three-story, nine-bay, yellow brick addition was built in 1928. It features a large corbelled brick cornice, sandstone sills and lintels, and three large brick chimneys with corbelled caps. The school was named after the founder of the D. Landreth Seed Company.

The building was added to the National Register of Historic Places in 1986.

References

External links
 

School buildings on the National Register of Historic Places in Philadelphia
Gothic Revival architecture in Pennsylvania
School buildings completed in 1889
South Philadelphia